The 2015 Geelong Football Club season is currently the club's 116th season of senior competition in the Australian Football League (AFL). The club also fielded its reserves team in the Victorian Football League (VFL) for the 16th season. It was the club's first season since 2006 to not make the top 8.

Club personnel
Joel Selwood was appointed the club's captain for a fourth successive season, with Harry Taylor retaining the role of vice-captain. Additionally, Andrew Mackie and Tom Hawkins remain in the player leadership group from the prior season, with Corey Enright the sole promotion to the group. Mitch Duncan, Steve Johnson, James Kelly and Mathew Stokes were not included in the group from the previous season – partly due to the club deciding to reduce the number of player leadership positions.

Chris Scott continues as the club's senior coach for his fifth season, after signing a two-year contract extension in August 2014 extending his tenure until the end of 2017. Following the departure of football manager Neil Balme to the vacant Collingwood football director position, his assistant Steve Hocking was promoted to football manager in November 2014.

The coaching department underwent a restructure prior to the season, with Matthew Knights promoted to assistant coach after three seasons as the club's VFL coach. Knights will coach the midfield group alongside existing assistant coach Nigel Lappin, and joins the assistant coaching team of Dale Amos (backline), James Rahilly (forwards) and Blake Caracella (in his new portfolio of attack and defence strategy). Paul Hood assumes an expanded role, replacing Knights as VFL coach as well continuing in his position as the club's academy co-ordinator. The club's academy coaching panel, overseen by Hood, consists of existing development coach Max Rooke, as well as new additions Shane O'Bree (moving from the assistant coaching panel) and former Geelong player Matthew Scarlett (in a part-time role).

Playing list
Despite no player retirements at the conclusion of the 2014 AFL season, Geelong made a number of changes to its playing list, delisting Mitch Brown, George Burbury, Joel Hamling, Taylor Hunt, Jordan Schroder, Jackson Sheringham and Jesse Stringer. Additionally, Nick Bourke was removed from the club's rookie list.

Geelong were involved in four incoming and outgoing trades during the annual trade period, the first of which resulted in Allen Christensen being traded to the Brisbane Lions in exchange for pick 21 in the upcoming National Draft. The club also traded dual premiership player Travis Varcoe to Collingwood as part of a three-club trade that netted Mitch Clark from Melbourne, and gained Rhys Stanley and pick 60 in the Draft in a separate deal with St Kilda in exchange for pick 21. The final trade resulted in Geelong swapping draft picks 14 and 35 to Adelaide for picks 10 and 47—attaining the club's first top-10 draft selection since the 2006 AFL draft. Additionally, the club recruited former Melbourne player Sam Blease as a delisted free agent.

A total of four players were drafted by Geelong in the 2014 National Draft: Nakia Cockatoo (pick 10), Cory Gregson, (48), Dean Gore (55) and Jordan Cunico (59). Following the elevation of Mark Blicavs to the senior list, Geelong also drafted Tom Read (pick 14) and Cameron Delaney (32) in the 2015 Rookie Draft, as well as Padraig Lucey (49)—a participant in the reality television series The Recruit. Geelong did not participate in the corresponding Pre-season Draft.

As part of its list management strategy, Geelong elected to list its six eligible players as veterans, meaning the club is able to pay a fixed amount per veteran outside the salary cap. The six players—who must have completed 10 seasons with the club to qualify—were Jimmy Bartel, Corey Enright, Steve Johnson, James Kelly, 
Tom Lonergan and Andrew Mackie.

After spending time away from the club to consider his future, Brad Hartman decided to leave the club in May 2015 due to his struggles in meeting the professional standards required of an AFL player. Hartman had only played five senior games for Geelong – all during the 2014 season. In the same month, rookie-listed player James Toohey also decided to retire from senior-level football, citing a desire to return to full-time university studies.

Due to the long-term injury of Lincoln McCarthy, rookie-listed Michael Luxford was upgraded to the senior list on 27 May 2015 and immediately selected as an emergency for Geelong's round nine match against West Coast. Luxford made his AFL debut the following round against Essendon, when he was included as a late change replacing an injured Rhys Stanley.

Ruckman Hamish McIntosh announced his retirement in July 2015, due to a recurrence of an ankle injury that had hampered his three seasons at the club. After playing 107 games for North Melbourne, McIntosh ultimately played 19 games for Geelong—all during the 2014 season. This was followed by two more retirements due to injury, Jared Rivers (who required surgery on a torn meniscus in the knee) and Sam Blease (due to a delayed concussion sustained in a VFL match during the season).

It was announced prior to Geelong's final match of the season that veteran players Steve Johnson, James Kelly and Mathew Stokes would not be offered new contracts for the 2016 season. The trio all played their farewell match against Adelaide at Simonds Stadium, with Geelong winning by 39 points.

Statistics
 Players are listed in alphabetical order by surname, and statistics are for AFL regular season and finals series matches during the 2015 AFL season only.

Season summary

Pre-season matches

Regular season

Ladder

Finals series
After finishing tenth on the ladder, Geelong failed to qualify for the 2015 AFL finals series; as a result, it was the first time the club had not played in the finals since the 2006 AFL season.

Honours

Awards
The following club awards were presented at the Carji Greeves Medal Night on 8 October:
 Carji Greeves Medal – Mark Blicavs
 Best Young Player – Darcy Lang
 Coach's Award – Steve Johnson
 Community Champion – Corey Enright
 Tom Harley Award (Best Clubman) – Andrew Mackie
 VFL Best and Fairest – Tom Ruggles
Other honours:
 Leading goalkicker – Tom Hawkins (46 goals)
 Most club votes in the Brownlow Medal – Joel Selwood (13 votes; ineligible)

Milestones
 Round 1 – Mitch Clark (Geelong debut); Nakia Cockatoo (AFL debut); Cory Gregson (AFL debut)
 Round 2 – Rhys Stanley (Geelong debut)
 Round 3 – Chris Scott (100 games coached); Mitch Clark (100 games)
 Round 4 – Tom Hawkins (150 games)
 Round 5 – Mark Blicavs (50 games)
 Round 6 – Tom Lonergan (150 games)
 Round 7 – Sam Blease (Geelong debut)
 Round 10 – Jordan Murdoch (50 games); Michael Luxford (AFL debut)
 Round 12 – Corey Enright (300 games); Jake Kolodjashnij (AFL debut)
 Round 19 – Joel Selwood (200 games)
 Round 20 – Steve Johnson (250 games)

Other
 Round 2 – George Horlin-Smith (2015 AFL Mark of the Year nomination)
 Round 4 – Mitch Clark (2015 AFL Mark of the Year nomination)
 Round 6 – Cory Gregson (2015 AFL Rising Star nomination); Jordan Murdoch (2015 AFL Goal of the Year nomination)
 Round 9 – Steve Johnson (2015 AFL Goal of the Year nomination)
 Round 10 – James Kelly (AFL Life Membership)
 Round 12 – Joel Selwood (2015 AFL Goal of the Year nomination)
 Round 18 – Steve Johnson scored two goals to place him third in Geelong's all-time goalkickers rankings, overtaking former player Billy Brownless' 441 career goals.
 Round 19 – Jackson Thurlow (2015 AFL Rising Star nomination); Nakia Cockatoo (2015 AFL Mark of the Year nomination)
 Round 20 – Cameron Guthrie (2015 AFL Goal of the Year nomination)
 Round 21 – Darcy Lang (2015 AFL Rising Star nomination)
 Round 22 – Daniel Menzel (2015 AFL Mark of the Year nomination); Steven Motlop (2015 AFL Goal of the Year nomination)
 Round 23 – Steve Johnson (2015 AFL Goal of the Year nomination)

Match Review Panel charges

VFL season

Squad
The 2015 VFL squad was finalised in March 2015, and consists of 23 players—15 of whom were retained from the prior season—as well an additional development squad consisting of three players. Jackson Sheringham, delisted from the club's senior list at the conclusion of the 2014 season, is one of the notable additions to the VFL playing list. In addition to this squad of players, senior and rookie-listed players for Geelong's AFL team are eligible for selection in VFL matches.

 Development squad
 Josh Guthrie
 Ryley Stuhldreier
 Marcus Thompson

In a departure from tradition, the club appointed a leadership group to share the captaincy role throughout the season. The group consisted four of the squad's experienced players: Jack Hollmer, Ben Raidme, Jackson Sheringham and Ryan Williams.

Results

Practice matches

Regular season

Ladder

Finals series
After finishing 11th on the ladder, Geelong failed to qualify for the 2015 VFL finals series.

Notes
 Key

 H ^ Home match.
 A ^ Away match.

 Notes
Geelong's scores are indicated in bold font.
Tom Hawkins was originally selected for his 150th game in Round 3, but was a late withdrawal following the death of his mother, Jennifer. After spending time with his family, Hawkins opted to return the following week and play his milestone game in Round 4 against .
The venue for Geelong's opening round match against  was changed from Werribee's home ground of Avalon Airport Oval to Simonds Stadium after the condition of the ground was not ready for a VFL match. Consequently, the Round 12 match between the two clubs was moved from Simonds Stadium to Avalon Airport Oval.

References

External links
 Official website of the Geelong Football Club
 Official website of the Australian Football League

2015
Geelong Football Club